This is a list of television programmes broadcast by Hong Kong English language television channel ViuTVsix.

Current programming

Drama

HBO Originals

Other

Documentary, lifestyle and factual television

Kids/Teens

Music

News, politics and finance

Sports

Notes

See also 
 HK Television Entertainment

References

External links 
 ViuTVsix EPG

ViuTVsix
ViuTVsix